In mathematics, a slender group is a torsion-free abelian group that is "small" in a sense that is made precise in the definition below.

Definition 

Let ZN denote the Baer–Specker group, that is, the group of all integer sequences, with termwise addition. For each natural number n, let en be the sequence with n-th term equal to 1 and all other terms 0.

A torsion-free abelian group G is said to be slender if every homomorphism from ZN into G maps all but finitely many of the en to the identity element.

Examples 

Every free abelian group is slender.

The additive group of rational numbers Q is not slender: any mapping of the en into Q extends to a homomorphism from the free subgroup generated by the en, and as Q is injective this homomorphism extends over the whole of ZN. Therefore, a slender group must be reduced.

Every countable reduced torsion-free abelian group is slender, so every proper subgroup of Q is slender.

Properties 
 A torsion-free abelian group is slender if and only if it is reduced and contains no copy of the Baer–Specker group and no copy of the p-adic integers for any p.
 Direct sums of slender groups are also slender.
 Subgroups of slender groups are slender.
 Every homomorphism from ZN into a slender group factors through Zn for some natural number n.

References 
 .
  
 
 

Properties of groups
Abelian group theory